Đoàn Khuê (Triệu Phong, 29 October 1923 – 16 January 1999) was a Vietnamese Army general and Minister of Defence from 1992-1997.

Đoàn Khuê was born on 29 October 1923 in Triệu Phong District in Quảng Trị Province, joined the Communist Party of Vietnam in 1945, and served as the military Commissioner of the provincial Party Committee.

Military career
Đoàn held various positions during the resistance against French rule (First Indochina War) which was Political Commissar.

Other positions which he held include:-
 Political Commissar of the 351st Division Artillery of the Viet Minh
 Deputy Political Commissar of 3rd Military Region (Vietnam People's Army)
 Commander of 5th Military Region (Vietnam People's Army) (1977–80)
 Commander of volunteer Army of Vietnam in Cambodia

From 1987 to 1991, he was the Chief of the General Staff of the Vietnam People's Army.

Promotions
 Major General, 1974
 Lieutenant General, 1980
 Colonel General, 1984
 Army General, 1990

Political career

Đoàn served as Minister of Defense from 1991 to 1997 under Prime Ministers Đỗ Mười and Võ Văn Kiệt.

Awards

 State of Vietnam Gold Star (posthumously)
 Vietnam Medal of Honor
 2 first-class Victory Medal
 Order of Victory, first class
 Order of the Resistance

Personal

He has two other siblings:

 Đoàn Chương, Minister of military strategy
 Đoàn Thúy, Army Captain

References

1922 births
1999 deaths
Vietnamese generals
Ministers of Defence of Vietnam
Government ministers of Vietnam
Members of the 6th Politburo of the Communist Party of Vietnam
Members of the 7th Politburo of the Communist Party of Vietnam
Members of the 8th Politburo of the Communist Party of Vietnam
Members of the 4th Central Committee of the Communist Party of Vietnam
Members of the 5th Central Committee of the Communist Party of Vietnam
Members of the 6th Central Committee of the Communist Party of Vietnam
Members of the 7th Central Committee of the Communist Party of Vietnam
Members of the 8th Central Committee of the Communist Party of Vietnam
North Vietnamese military personnel of the Vietnam War
People from Quảng Trị province